Charles Alexander Joel (born 1971 in London, England) is a British/German pianist and conductor.

Career 
Joel began his conducting career in Nuremberg, followed by positions at Baden bei Wien, Klagenfurt and the Vienna Volksoper. From 2001 to 2007 he held the position of Erster Kapellmeister at the Deutsche Oper am Rhein in Duesseldorf and Duisburg

He has served as guest conductor for numerous orchestras in Europe and elsewhere, including the Bavarian State Opera, the Sächsische Staatskapelle Dresden, the MDR Symphony Orchestra, the Deutsches Symphonie-Orchester Berlin and the Hamburg State Opera  (Hamburgische Staatsoper). Outside Germany, Joel has conducted at the Teatro Regio in Parma, Italy, the Finnish National Opera, Helsinki, Municipal Theater of Santiago, Chile, and the Théâtre des Champs-Élysées, Paris, among others.

From the  2007/2008 to the 2013/14 season Alexander Joel was the musical director (Generalmusikdirektor) of Staatstheater Braunschweig and principal conductor of Staatsorchester Braunschweig, succeeding Jonas Alber, who had led the orchestra since 1997.

Personal life 
Joel is a grandson of Karl Amson Joel and the half brother of American singer/songwriter Billy Joel and his sister Judith Joel. His parents were Audrey and Howard Joel. His father, born in Nuremberg, Germany, as Helmut Joel, had immigrated with his parents to the United States as refugees from Nazi persecution of Jews. He worked in New York as an engineer, where he married his first wife. They had two children together. After they divorced in 1957, Howard Joel returned to Europe. He married Audrey.

References

Sources
Berns, Hajo, "Mozarts Schwanengesang", Westdeutsche Allgemeine Zeitung, 17 April 2009, Accessed 27 October 2009 (in German).
Deutsche Oper am Rhein, Alexander Joel. Accessed 27 October 2009 (in German).
Likus, Harald, "Ein Joel klingt nicht wie der andere", Braunschweiger Zeitung, 22 December 2005. Accessed 27 October 2009 (in German).
Lipson, Karen, "A tale of two Nazi-era families", Newsday, 19 January 2003. Accessed via subscription 27 October 2009
Paxmann, Jürgen, "Neuer Dirigent gastiert in Helmstedt", Braunschweiger Zeitung, 26 April 2008. Accessed 27 October 2009 (in German).
Staatstheater Braunschweig, Alexander Joel. Accessed 27 October 2009 (in German).
Summa Cum Laude International Youth Music Festival, Alexander Joel, Conductor. Accessed 27 October 2009
Tallmer, Jerry, "Billy Joel grapples with the past", The Villager, Vol. 73, Issue 11, July 16–22, 2003. Accessed 27 October 2009

External links
 Official Website
 "L'invité culturel: Alexander Joel, chef d'orchestre, dirige Madame Butterfly au Grand Théâtre de Genève". Interview with Alexander Joel, RTS Un, 29 April 2013  (Video)

1971 births
20th-century German Jews
21st-century German Jews
Living people
German classical pianists
Male classical pianists
British male pianists
German conductors (music)
Male conductors (music)
British classical pianists
British male conductors (music)
British Jews
Music directors (opera)
21st-century British conductors (music)
21st-century British male musicians